Wuxuan County is a county in the east-central part of Guangxi, China. It is under the administration of the prefecture-level city of Laibin.

During the Cultural Revolution, the county was the site of pitched battles between rival factions. The investigative journalist Zheng Yi wrote of these battles and cases of cannibalism of members of the fallen faction in his book Scarlet Memorial: Tales Of Cannibalism In Modern China.

Climate

Notes

References

Further reading

External links

Counties of Guangxi
Laibin
Incidents of cannibalism
Cannibalism in Asia